Eric Matthews may refer to:

Eric Matthews (wrestler) (born 1933), New Zealand wrestler
Eric Matthews (musician) (born 1969), American composer, musician, recording artist and record producer

Characters
Eric Matthews (Boy Meets World) (born 1978), brother of titular "boy"
Eric Matthews (Saw), police officer portrayed by American actor Donnie Wahlberg

See also
Erik Mathews Flowers (born 1978), American football defensive end
Matthews (surname)